Parliamentary elections were held in the Marshall Islands on 22 November 1999. As there were no political parties, all candidates for the 33 seats ran as independents.

References

1999
1999 elections in Oceania
1999 in the Marshall Islands
Non-partisan elections